On 4 June 1969, Mexicana de Aviación Flight 704, a Boeing 727-64 airliner registered XA-SEL, crashed near Salinas Victoria, some 20 miles north of the city of Monterrey. All 79 people on board were killed.

Accident 
Flight MX704 departed Mexico City, bound for Monterrey, at 07:02 local time. The flight was uneventful until approach, when the crew began descending at a vertical speed of 1500–1600 ft / min (460–490 m / min) at an airspeed of 250 knots. During its approach to Del Norte International Airport, the crew contacted the landing controller and requested weather conditions and traffic information. The dispatcher reported that the weather over the airport was cloudy with a lower boundary of 500 feet (150 m) with haze, light raining, and no other aircraft in the airport zone. The crew asked if the radio beacon at Cienega de Flores was operating, and received word that it was not functioning due to an electrical power outage. Flight 704 then reported that, for some reason, they received a signal similar to the signal from this beacon. The crew then reported the airport in sight, and began to carry out the final approach. This was the last transmission from the aircraft.

The aircraft collided with Cerro del Fraile mountain range and broke up, killing all 79 people on board. The crash was the deadliest aviation accident on Mexican soil until Mexicana Flight 940, another Boeing 727, crashed on 31 March 1986, killing all 167 people on board.

Aircraft 
The aircraft involved was a two-year-old Boeing 727-064 registered XA-SEL (factory - 19256, serial - 355) The aircraft's maiden flight was on 6 January 1967. On 17 January, the aircraft was delivered to Mexicana de Aviación (later re branded as Mexicana), where it was named Azteca de Oro. The aircraft was powered by three Pratt & Whitney JT8D-7B turbofan engines.

Crew 
The captain was Guillermo García Ramos, a World War II veteran. He was experienced in both military and commercial aviation. He had 15,000 flying hours on commercial aircraft. The first officer was Carlos de Iturbide Magallón. The flight engineer was Alfonso Navarro Mazzini.

Notable passengers 
Notable passengers on the flight included Mexican tennis star Rafael Osuna, the architect Jorge González Reyna and politician Carlos A. Madrazo.

Investigation 
The Secretariat of Communications and Transportation (SCT) investigated the accident and determined the pilot did not follow the proper landing approach path. The official report states in part that "the pilot flew over the VOR of Monterrey (VHF Omnidirectional Range or Omnidirectional Radiofaro VHF) without reporting to the land station to then turn to the right and then another to the left in continuous descent keeping course of 260º until crashing with the Cerro de los Tres Picos when it was still turning smoothly to the left and bearing a 232º course."

The investigating board was unable to determine the reason for such a deviation, since the last few minutes of the recording were absent from the cockpit voice recorder. It was also not possible to determine which radio beacon the fight had been receiving, as the airport radio beacon at that moment stopped working due to loss of electrical power.
Since well-known Mexican politician Carlos Madrazo was on board, there were also hypotheses regarding political assassination, which cannot be refuted or proved due to insufficient evidence.

Conspiracy theories 
Some Mexican media, such as Uno TV, have argued that the accident was a premeditated, political assassination act, since politician Carlos Madrazo was in the aircraft when it crashed. In an interview with Revista Proceso in Mexico, writer Patricia Rosas Lopategui also argued that the crash was a political assassination targeting Madrazo.

See also 
 All Nippon Airways Flight 60, another 727 which crash on approach for possible similar reason to Flight 704.

References

External links

Aviation accidents and incidents in 1969
Accidents and incidents involving the Boeing 727
Aviation accidents and incidents in Mexico
Airliner accidents and incidents involving controlled flight into terrain
Mexicana de Aviación accidents and incidents
1969 in Mexico
June 1969 events in Mexico
Conspiracy theories involving aviation incidents